Isomaltol is a natural furan obtained by the enzymatic degradation of starch.  It is also a flavor component in bread crust, produced by thermal degradation (caramelization) of sugars.
Isomaltol is obtained after the Maillard reaction from an amino acid and a reducing sugar

See also
 Maltol

References

Flavors
Furans
Ketones
Hydroxyarenes